Valens Semiconductor (Valens) is an Israeli fabless manufacturing company providing semiconductors for the automotive and audio-video industries. Valens provides semiconductor products for the distribution of uncompressed ultra-high-definition (UHD) multimedia content and in-vehicle connectivity applications. The company is a member of the MIPI Alliance and developed the first-to-market chipset that is compliant with the MIPI A-PHY standard. Valens invented the technology behind the HDBaseT standard and is a co-founder of the HDBaseT Alliance.

History
Valens was founded in 2006 by a group of semiconductor industry veterans to develop integrated circuits that enable high quality, long-distance transmission of audio and video over standard Category cables.

In January 2009, HDBaseT products were first demonstrated at the Consumer Electronics Show in Las Vegas.

On June 14, 2010, Valens - together with Samsung Electronics, Sony Pictures Entertainment and LG Electronics - incorporated the HDBaseT Alliance, to standardize the HDBaseT technology invented by Valens. The HDBaseT 1.0 specification was ratified in June 2010. External accessories, such as extenders, were on the market in 2010 for devices not yet embedded with HDBaseT. The technology enabled the convergence of ultra-HD video, audio, Ethernet, controls, and power over a single Category cable, for distances of up to 100 meters.

In mid-2013, the HDBaseT Alliance issued Spec 2.0, an update to the original specification, which enriched the HDBaseT offering to the pro-AV market. Spec 2.0 maintained all the features of Spec 1.0 and added USB convergence, as well as networking, switching, and control-point capabilities such as flexible and fully utilized mesh topology, distributed routing, and end-to-end error handling, enabling multipoint-to-multipoint connectivity and multistreaming.

In September 2015, Valens won the Technology & Engineering Emmy Award, given by the National Academy of Television Arts and Sciences (NATAS) for outstanding achievement in the development and Standardization of HDBaseT Connectivity Technology for Commercial and Residential HDMI/DVI Installations.

In January 2016, Valens announced its intention to branch out and offer its chipsets to the automotive market, partnering with General Motors, Delphi Automotive, and Daimler AG. Valens' automotive chipsets enable connectivity in advanced driver-assistance systems, autonomous driving systems and infotainment systems.

In June 2017, Valens introduced the VA6000 chipset family for automotive applications. The VA6000 uses the principle of multi-format aggregation over a single unshielded twisted pair cable with a length of up to 15 meters. The chipsets are integrated in the Mercedes-Benz S-Class, which was launched in September 2020.

In June 2019, the HDBaseT Alliance announced Spec 3.0, which maintained all the features of Spec 2.0 and increased bandwidth over the HDBaseT link to support uncompressed HDMI 2.0 (4K@60 4:4:4), 1Gbps Ethernet, and enhanced USB performance. Valens introduced the VS3000 Stello in June 2019 as well – a chipset family compliant with the HDBaseT Spec 3.0.

In June 2019, the MIPI Alliance announced that Valens’ technology was selected as the foundation for its Automotive Physical Layer standard (A-PHY). The standard will be used by the automotive industry to provide high-speed links for cameras, radars, LiDARs and displays for advanced driver-assistance systems and autonomous driving systems. A-PHY was adopted by the IEEE in July 2021.

Funding
In July 2007, Valens raised $7 million in its first financing round, from venture capital funds Genesis Partners and Magma Venture Partners. 

In July 2011, Valens raised $14 million in its second round of funding. The round of financing included previous investors Genesis Partners and Magma Venture Partners, as well as new investors Aviv Venture Capital, Taiwan electronics firm Pegatron and Japan's Mitsui & Co. Global Investment Ltd., and US venture capital fund Amiti Ventures. 

In January 2016, Valens raised $20 million in its third round of funding and announced its intention to enter the automotive market. 

In May 2021, Valens announced plans to list on the New York Stock Exchange through a business combination with PTK Acquisition Corp., a special purpose acquisition company. The company began publicly trading on the NYSE under the ticker name VLN in September 2021.

Technology
Valens' HDBaseT technology is used for transmitting uncompressed high quality images and audio from the base stations, potentially up to a distance of 100 meters (328 ft) through a single cable, to remote displays as a part of its 5PlayTM system. HDBaseT is transmitted over category 6a cables with 8P8C modular connectors of the type commonly used for Ethernet local area network connections. HDBaseT transmits uncompressed ultra-high-definition video (up to 4K), audio, power over HDBaseT (PoH - up to 100W), Ethernet, USB, and a series of controls such as RS and IR.

HDBaseT is complementary to standards such as HDMI, and it is an alternative to radio frequency, coaxial cable, composite video, S-Video, SCART, component video, D-Terminal, or VGA. HDBaseT connects and networks CE devices such as set-top boxes except Cisco and Scientific Atlantic boxes, DVD players, Blu-ray Disc players, personal computers (PCs), video game consoles, switches, matrices, projectors, and AV receivers to compatible digital audio devices, computer monitors, and digital televisions.

References

Technology companies established in 2006
Semiconductor companies of Israel
Hod HaSharon
Israeli companies established in 2006
Companies listed on the New York Stock Exchange
Special-purpose acquisition companies